Sophy Pollak Regensburg (1885 – April 6, 1974) was an American naïve painter.

Born in New York City, Regensburg was a member of a prominent family; her brother, Walter Pollak, sat on the New York Stock Exchange. She was married to cigar maker Melville E. Regensburg, with whom she had three children, until his death. Active during her marriage as a volunteer, she took up painting in widowhood, when her physician suggested she needed to slow down; she had studied under William Merritt Chase and Robert Henri at the New York School of Art. In 1952, the first year in which she was involved in the hobby, she won a gold medal in the National Amateur Painters Competition; she would go on to present work in thirteen one-woman shows and fifteen group exhibits before her death. She produced mainly still lifes. Her work is represented in the collections of the American Folk Art Museum, the Miami University Art Museum, and Smith College.

References

1885 births
1974 deaths
American women painters
Naïve painters
20th-century American painters
American still life painters
20th-century American women artists
Painters from New York City
Parsons School of Design alumni
Students of William Merritt Chase
Students of Robert Henri